Southport Island, with the adjacent Southport Reef, is a 7 ha island in south-eastern Australia.  It is part of the Actaeon Island Group, lying close to the south-eastern coast of Tasmania, at the southern entrance to the D'Entrecasteaux Channel between Bruny Island and the mainland.

Flora and fauna
The principal vegetation community is coastal heath, dominated by Acacia, Banksia, Leptospermum, Melaleuca and Westringia species.  Blackberry is a problem weed.  The island is being used as a translocation site for the endangered heath Epacris stuartii, which is threatened in its nearby natural habitat by cinnamon fungus.

Recorded breeding seabird species are the little penguin, short-tailed shearwater, silver gull and crested tern.  The metallic skink is present.

References

Islands of Tasmania